The 2023 West Virginia Mountaineers baseball team represent the University of West Virginia during the 2023 NCAA Division I baseball season. The Mountaineers play their home games at Monongalia County Ballpark as a member of the Big 12 Conference. They are led by head coach Randy Mazey, in his 11th season at West Virginia.

The Mountaineers traveled to Salt River Fields at Talking Stick in Scottsdale, Arizona to take part in an MLB Spring Training game against the Arizona Diamondbacks on January 27.

References 

West Virginia
West Virginia Mountaineers baseball seasons
WVU Mountaineers